The 2021–22 season was Bournemouth's second consecutive season in the Championship and the 120th year in their history. This season, the club participated in the Championship, FA Cup and EFL Cup. The season covered the period from 1 July 2021 to 30 June 2022.

With a 1–0 home win over Nottingham Forest on 2 May 2022, Bournemouth secured automatic promotion back to the Premier League.

Managerial changes
On 27 June 2021, it was announced that Jonathan Woodgate would leave as role as first team manager when his contract expired on 30 June 2021. A day later the club announced Scott Parker as the new head coach on a three-year contract.

Pre-season friendlies
The Cherries announced pre-season friendlies against Linense, Granada and Chelsea as part of their preparations for the new season.

Competitions

Championship

League table

Results summary

Results by matchday

Matches
The Cherries fixtures were released on 24 June 2021.

FA Cup

Bournemouth were drawn away to Yeovil Town in the third round, and home to Boreham Wood in the fourth round.

EFL Cup

Bournemouth were drawn at home to Milton Keynes Dons in the first round and away to Norwich City in the second round.

Transfers

Transfers in

Loans in

Loans out

Transfers out

Squad statistics

Appearances and goals

|-
! colspan=14 style=background:#dcdcdc; text-align:center|Players who have made an appearance or had a squad number this season but have left the club

|-
|}

References

Bournemouth
AFC Bournemouth seasons